Delsey is a French company which manufactures luggage and travel accessories. It is based in Tremblay-en-France, in the Paris suburbs. As of 2010, it held second place in the global luggage market, behind Samsonite.

History 
In 1911, the Établissements Delahaye specialised in the manufacture of cases for cameras and covered cases for typewriters and record players. Émile Delahaye and the Seynhaeve brothers joined forces in 1946, combining their names to create the Delsey brand. Delsey made use of its experience in the production of camera and record player cases to form a department specializing in travel items in moulded plastic.

Innovations
In early 2015, Delsey unveiled a prototype "smart suitcase" called Pluggage, containing built-in electronic gadgets which communicate with a smartphone app. Features include a weighing scale, locator beacon, wireless speaker, remote locking, and phone charger. This is similar to the competing Airbus Bag2Go and Bluesmart cases which are being developed at the same time as Delsey's product.

Competition 

 Samsonite
 VIP Bags

References

External links 

 Official website-US

Manufacturing companies of France
French brands
Luggage brands
Luggage manufacturers